Steelhammer is the 14th studio album by German heavy metal band U.D.O., released on 24 May 2013 via AFM Records. It is the first album with guitarist Andrey Smirnov. Second guitarist Kasperi Heikkinen joined the band after all recordings were completed. It is also the first album without Stefan Kaufmann as guitarist since the 1997 album Solid, as well as the first without guitarist Igor Gianola since the 1999 album Holy. Steelhammer charted at #21 in Germany, #23 in Sweden, #38 in Finland and #67 in Norway during its first week. Music videos were made for "Metal Machine" and "Heavy Rain".

Track listing

Personnel 
 Udo Dirkschneider – vocals
 Andrey Smirnov – guitars
 Fitty Wienhold – bass
 Francesco Jovino – drums

Guest musicians
 Víctor García González – additional vocals on "Basta Ya" and "Dust and Rust ("Basta Ya" English Version)"
 Sascha Onnen – piano on "Heavy Rain"
 Frank Knight – spoken words on "A Cry of a Nation"
 Claus Fischer – vocals (choirs)
 Ingmar Viertel – vocals (choirs)
 Bernhard Müssig – vocals (choirs)
 Claus Rettkowski – vocals (choirs)
 Holger Thielbörger – vocals (choirs)

Production
 Udo Dirkschneider – producer, mixing
 Fitty Wienhold – producer
 Dirk Hüttner – artwork, design
 Holger Thielbörger – editing
 Martin Häusler – photography
 Martin Pfeiffer – mixing
 Tim Eckhorst – layout, booklet
 Markus Teske – orchestral arrangement on "Book of Faith", editing, mastering
 Patrick Spina – engineering (drums), editing (drums)
 Víctor García González – lyrics, translation on "Basta Ya"

References 

U.D.O. albums
2013 albums
AFM Records albums